The 1987 French motorcycle Grand Prix was the eighth round of the 1987 Grand Prix motorcycle racing season. It took place on the weekend of 18–19 July 1987 at the Bugatti Circuit located in Le Mans.

Classification

500 cc

References

French motorcycle Grand Prix
French
Motorcycle Grand Prix